Bulk Jupiter  was a Bahamas registered cargo ship. She sank off the coast of Vietnam on 2 January 2015.

History

Sinking
On 2 January 2015  Bulk Jupiter sank off the coast of Vũng Tàu, Vietnam. She departed from Kuantan, Malaysia on 30 December 2014 with a crew of 19 Filipino sailors and a cargo of 46,400 tons of bauxite. 

The Vietnam Maritime Search and Rescue Coordination Center (Vietnam MRCC) and The Japanese Coast Guard received distress signals at 22:54 hours UTC on 1 January in position lat 9".01' 01:001N, long 109" 15' 26.01E from Bulk Jupiter, but were unable to make contact with the vessel. 

Dispatched rescue vessels found one crew member, the ship's cook, who was rescued and was the only survivor. Later searches found two other bodies. The remaining 16 crew members are presumed dead. 

Early reports indicated that the likely cause of the sinking was sudden loss of stability (free surface effect)
from the bauxite cargo.

Investigation and corrective action 
 IMO has approved a circular to warn ships' masters about the liquefaction hazards of bauxite.

References

2006 ships
Ships built by Mitsui Engineering and Shipbuilding
2015 disasters in Vietnam
Merchant ships of the Bahamas
Maritime incidents in 2015
Maritime incidents in Vietnam
Shipwrecks in the South China Sea